Bryan Gates is an assistant coach for the Phoenix Suns. Before joining the Suns, Gates was an assistant coach for the Minnesota Timberwolves, the Sacramento Kings, and the New Orleans Pelicans. Outside of the National Basketball Association, Gates was the head coach of the Beirut Blue Stars, Oklahoma Storm, and Idaho Stampede, and while with the Stampede twice won the NBA G League Coach of the Year Award.

Early life and education
Gates spent his childhood in Anchorage, Alaska as a ball boy during the Great Alaska Shootout tournaments. After completing his post-secondary education at Boise State University, he declined a job in technology to work in basketball.

Career

Late 1990s to early 2000s
In 1997, Gates began his career as an intern with the Idaho Stampede in basketball operations. While part of the Continental Basketball Association team, 
Gates continued his intern position when he became an account executive that year. He later became an assistant coach with Idaho at the end of 1997. As a member of the International Basketball Association in 1998, Gates joined the Rapid City Thrillers in assistant positions as a general manager and coach. In 1999, Gates became a director of player personnel for the Stampede. While in his director position until 2001, Gates continued his assistant coaching experience with Idaho to 2003.

When the Oklahoma Storm held their first ever game in 2000, Gates was one of their head coaches for the United States Basketball League team alongside Denny Price. In the USBL, Gates and the Storm were defeated by Dodge City during the league's championship game in 2000. After Price died in 2000, Gates became the sole coach of the Storm for the following season. With the Storm in 2001, Gates and his team reached the postseason's first round. During this time period, Gates coached the Global Sports basketball team in exhibition games while with the Storm. In 2003, Gates coached the Hickory Nutz as part of the Carolinas Basketball League. That season, Gates was the CBL Coach of the Year and won the league championship with the Nutz.

Mid to late 2000s
When the Florence Flyers became an USBL team, Gates was chosen as their head coach in February 2004. With the Flyers, Gates also worked as their general manager before becoming a temporary owner of the team. Gates was released from his coaching position in May 2004. With the Flyers, Gates had 9 wins and 20 losses.

In 2005, Gates resumed his tenure with the Storm when he became their head coach and general manager. The following year, Gates continued to work with the Storm as their head coach. Gates was selected as the Coach of the Year for the USBL in 2006. As a USBL coach with the Storm between 2000 to 2006, Gates had 74 wins and 46 losses.

For the NBA D-League, Gates became an assistant coach for the Austin Toros in 2005. The following year, he became head coach of the Idaho Stampede in 2006 and led his team to win the 2007-08 D League Championship. In 2008, Gates was chosen as one of the coaches for the NBA Development League All-Star Game. After leaving the Stampede in 2009, Gates had 100 wins and 50 losses as a D-League coach.

Late 2000s to 2020s
In 2009, Gates went to the National Basketball Association and became an assistant coach for multiple teams. He started with the Sacramento Kings in 2009. He then worked with the New Orleans Pelicans from 2010 to 2015 and the Minnesota Timberwolves from 2015 to 2016. In 2016, Gates returned to the Sacramento Kings until he rejoined the Timberwolves in 2019. Gates continued his assistant coaching career with the Phoenix Suns in 2021. While with the Suns, he was one of the coaches during the 2022 Rising Stars Challenge.

Outside of the United States, Gates coached the Beirut Blue Stars of the Lebanese Basketball League from 2004 to 2005. He was also an assistant coach for the Canada men's national basketball team that played at the 2015 Pan American Games.

Awards and personal life
Gates was twice named the NBA G League Coach of the Year with the Stampede, in 2007 and 2008. He is married with three children.

References

Year of birth missing (living people)
Living people
American men's basketball coaches
Austin Toros coaches
Basketball coaches from Alaska
Boise State University alumni
Idaho Stampede coaches
Minnesota Timberwolves assistant coaches
New Orleans Pelicans assistant coaches
Phoenix Suns assistant coaches
Sacramento Kings assistant coaches
Sportspeople from Anchorage, Alaska
United States Basketball League coaches